The following highways are numbered 365:

Canada
Manitoba Provincial Road 365
New Brunswick Route 365
Newfoundland and Labrador Route 365
 Quebec Route 365
Saskatchewan Highway 365

Japan
 Japan National Route 365

United States
  Arkansas Highway 365
  Arkansas Highway 365 Spur
 Florida:
  Florida State Road 365
  County Road 365 (Wakulla County, Florida)
  Georgia State Route 365
 Hawaii Route 365
  Louisiana Highway 365
  Maryland Route 365
  Mississippi Highway 365
 New York:
  New York State Route 365
  New York State Route 365A
 New York State Route 365 (former)
  Ohio State Route 365
  Texas State Highway 365 (former)
  Virginia State Route 365
Territories
  Puerto Rico Highway 365